Rigi is a mountain in Switzerland. Rigi may also refer to:

 Rigi, Nishapur, Razavi Khorasan Province, Iran
 Ghulam Mohammad Rigi
 Abdolmalek Rigi
 Abdolhamid Rigi
 Masoud Rigi
 Rigi (software)
 The Rigi, an 1842 series of the three paintings of the Swiss mountain by J. M. W. Turner

See also 
 Righi (disambiguation)